Leetown is a small community located at the western end of the Carse of Gowrie along the eastern seaboard of Scotland.

It lies between the A90 road and the Firth of Tay.

External links 

Its entry in the Gazetteer for Scotland

Villages in Perth and Kinross